Lake Winfred is a natural lake in South Dakota, in the United States.

Lake Winfred has the name of the daughter of a pioneer settler.

See also
List of lakes in South Dakota

References

Lakes of South Dakota
Lakes of Lake County, South Dakota